Distant Shore is the second solo album by Irish singer Órla Fallon. It was released in September 2009 under label Spring Hill Music Group. It was also released in 2010 under the label Green Hill Music on 20 April 2010.

The album was produced by Dan Shea and Eoghan O'Neill. It was recorded at Windmill Lane Studios in Dublin, Ireland and at Dark Horse Studios in Nashville, Tennessee.

The album "mixes traditional, contemporary, and original compositions."

Track listing 

Note: Track 5 is a song that was originally written earlier for the 2005/2006 Celtic Woman world tours.

Personnel 
 Shannon Forrest - drums
 Ilya Toshinsky - acoustic guitar, electric guitar
 Dan Shea - acoustic guitar, mandolin, piano, keyboards
 Des Moore - acoustic guitar
 Noel Eccles - percussion
 Jim Brickman - piano
 Dónal Lunny - bouzouki
 Liam Bradley
 Orla Fallon - vocals, harp, background vocals
 Feargal Murray
 Máíire Breatnach - fiddle, viola
 Robbie Harris - bodhran
 Alan Smale - strings
 Beth "Diva" Davis
 David James, Jr.
 Missi Hale - background vocals
 Todd Denman - whistling, pipe

References 

2009 albums